The Lambda Literary Award for Nonfiction is an annual literary award, presented by the Lambda Literary Foundation, that awards LGBT-themed nonfiction books whose intended audience is "general readers, as opposed to those targeted primarily to scholarly audiences." Anthologies and memoirs are not included as they have their own categories (i.e., Anthology, Gay Memoir, Lesbian Memoir, Bisexual Literature, and Transgender Literature).

Recipients

References 

Nonfiction
Awards established in 2006
English-language literary awards
Lists of LGBT-related award winners and nominees